Iván Martínez may refer to:
Iván Martínez (footballer) (born 1983), Spanish footballer
Iván Martínez Airport, Chilean airport